Mark Haysom  (born 1953) is a British former management executive.

Early life and education
Born in Margate, Kent, Haysom was educated at Hazelwood School, East Grinstead Grammar School (now Imberhorne School) and the University of Leicester where he read English.

Management executive career
Haysom trained as a journalist and edited weekly newspapers in the north of England. He worked in a variety of management roles at Reed International, Thomson Regional Newspapers and Trinity Mirror.

In 2003 Haysom was appointed as Chief Executive of the Learning and Skills Council (LSC). In 2005 he was awarded an Honorary Doctorate from Leicester University for his contribution to business. In 2008 he was awarded a CBE for services to education and training. He resigned from the LSC in March 2009 following the suspension and crisis surrounding the LSC's "Building Colleges for the Future programme.

Author
Haysom is an author of several short stories and novels including "Love, Love Me Do" (2014) and "Imagine" (2015).

Sources
Honorary Degree Oration 
CBE announcement 
Resignation statement
Epolitix interview
Times Higher article
Association of Colleges speech
Who Cleans Up In Schools?
HMRC Board profile
Mark Haysom's appearance before IUS Select Committee
They took a bullet for the boss
St Giles Trust
Berlinale
Irish Independent

References

1953 births
Living people
People educated at Hazelwood School
British businesspeople
Alumni of the University of Leicester
Commanders of the Order of the British Empire